Civil Lines is an upmarket neighbourhood in Karachi, Pakistan that was where much of Karachi's British officials and local elite resided during the colonial era. Numerous buildings of architectural significance are located in the locality, including civic administration buildings, churches, mansions, and social clubs.

History 
Civil Lines formed part of the "New Town" established during the colonial era, and developed shortly after the British gained control of Karachi from the Talpurs in 1839. It was built to the east of the densely-populated "Native Town" (made up of Mithadar and Jodia Bazaar), and was specifically designed to be spacious area, in contrast to the densely populated Native Town. It was primarily residential, and was where much of the British officials and local elite resided in Karachi during the colonial era. To the north of Civil Lines was the European commercial district of Saddar, and to the south the affluent seaside municipality of Clifton.

Following independence, the residential patterns established by the British continued, with Karachi's wealthy residents establishing affluent neighbourhoods in the southern and eastern parts of the city, with poorer areas in the north and west. 

There are several ethnic groups including Muhajirs, Punjabis, Sindhis, Kashmiris, Seraikis, Pakhtuns, Balochis, Memons, Bohras and Ismailis.

Main areas  
 PIDC
 Bagh-i-Quaid-i-Azam
 Chief Minister House
 Governor House
 Sindh Secretariat
 Shafi Court
 Hotel Metropolis
Pearl Continental Hotel
Move n Pick
Marriot Hotel
 Hijrat Colony
 Court of Law
 Dehli Colony
 Panjab Colony
 Hashmi Colony
 Kashmir Mujahid colony
 Frere Hall
 Artlary Madan

Gallery

References

External links 
 Karachi Website

Neighbourhoods of Karachi
Saddar Town